The flag of the Turkmen Soviet Socialist Republic was adopted by the Turkmen SSR on August 1, 1953. Although similar to the Flag of the Soviet Union, the layout is identical to the flag of the Kirghiz SSR with a ratio of 1:2. The two blue stripes between the red represents the rivers Amu Darya and Syr Darya, the red represents the "revolutionary struggle of the working masses", the hammer and sickle represents the peasants' and workers' union, and the red star is the symbol of the ruling Communist Party.

In 1926, the Turkmen flag was red with a large gold hammer and sickle in the top-left corner, similar to the flag of the Soviet Union. From 1937, the flag was red with the  Latin characters (T.S.S.R.) in gold in the top-left corner, in a sans-serif font. From the 1940, the flag was the same, but with the characters in Cyrillic characters ТССР (TSSR).

On September 26, 1973, the Presidium of the Supreme Soviet of the Turkmen SSR modified the regulation of the flag of Turkmen SSR. The position of the star and hammer and sickle was moved closer to the flag pole.

Between independence in 1991 and adoption of the new flag in February 1992, this flag remained the national flag of independent Turkmenistan.

History

Early project flags 

During the creation of the Constitution of the Turkmen SSR, a draft design for the flag of Turkmen SSR was created. The proposed flag was a red rectangular cloth depicting a golden sickle and hammer under the red 5-pointed star with a gold border and with drawings of four carpet gels on the main flag. But in the process of discussing the draft, this proposal was rejected.

First version 
On October 6, 1926, the Central Executive Committee of the Soviets of the Turkmen SSR adopted the Constitution of the Turkmen SSR, which was then approved by the 2nd All-Turkmen Congress of Soviets on 30 March 1927.

The flag was described on the Article 83 of the Constitution  :

Second version 
On March 2, 1937, the Extraordinary 6th Congress of Soviets of the Turkmen SSR adopted a new Constitution of the Turkmen Soviet Socialist Republic. The flag of the Turkmen SSR is described in Chapter X, Article 122 of the constitution :

Revision 

In May 1940, the Turkmen script was translated from the Latinized alphabet into the alphabet based on the Russian alphabet. On July 19, 1940, by the Decree of the Presidium of the Supreme Soviet of the Turkmen SSR "On the inscription on the national flag of the Turkmen SSR," it was approved "to change the text of the inscription in accordance to the new alphabet." The Article 122 was changed in accordance to this decree:

Third version 
On August 1, 1953, by the Decree "On the State Flag of the Turkmen SSR", the Presidium of the Supreme Soviet of the Turkmen SSR decided:

In accordance with this decree, the Constitution of the Turkmen SSR was amended. The design of the new flag is described in Article 122 of the constitution :

On May 16, 1956, the Decree of the Presidium of the Supreme Soviet of the Turkmen SSR approved the Regulations on the State Flag of the Turkmen SSR, in which it was specified that :

On September 20, 1966, by the Decree of the Presidium of the Armed Forces of the Turkmen SSR, the provision on the Turkmen SSR flag was supplemented: the list of holidays on which the flag of the republic was required was changed.

Approved by the Resolution of the Council of Ministers of the TSSR on September 26, 1973 (Resolution No. 353), the Instruction on the use of the Regulations on the State Flag of the Turkmen SSR, among other things, stipulated the possibility of raising the TSSR flag on sea vessels (forstenge) and on self-propelled vessels sailing (on bow mast) when they are the Chairman of the Presidium of the Supreme Soviet of the Turkmen SSR, Chairman of the Council of Ministers of the TSSR or other officials representing the Supreme Council of the TSSR and the Council of Ministers of the TSSR.

Revision 

On April 13, 1978, the extraordinary 9th session of the Supreme Soviet of the Turkmen SSR of the 9th convocation adopted a new Constitution of the Turkmen SSR. The flag was described in article 169 of the Constitution:

This description of the flag on May 6, 1978 by the Decree of the Presidium of the Supreme Soviet of the Turkmen SSR was included in the Regulations on the State Flag of the Turkmen SSR of 1956, which was amended by the Decree of the Presidium of the Supreme Soviet on September 23, 1974.

See also 
 Flag of the Soviet Union
 Coat of arms of the Turkmen SSR
 Flag of Turkmenistan

References

Citations

Bibliography

Constitutions 

Turkmen Soviet Socialist Republic
Soviet Socialist Republic
National symbols of Turkmenistan
Turkmen Soviet Socialist Republic